Pyrausta trimaculalis is a species of moth in the family Crambidae. It is found in the Republic of Macedonia, Greece and Turkey.

References

Moths described in 1867
trimaculalis
Moths of Europe
Moths of Asia